Mġarr ix-Xini, is a bay close to Għajnsielem (southwest), Xewkija and Sannat (southeast) on the Maltese island of Gozo. It lies in a gorge to the west of Mġarr Harbour, accessible mainly from the nearest village of Xewkija as well from Sannat.

History 
During the rule of the Order, it served as a small harbour for galleys. A small watchtower was built to defend the area in 1661, and it was restored several times in recent years.

Present Day 
Nowadays, this secluded spot is popular for swimming and diving. On 12 November 1999, the former Gozo ferry M

V Xlendi was purposely sunk to create an artificial reef and dive site. However, the ship rolled over while sinking and it ended up upside down. It may be unsafe for inexperienced divers.

The movie titled By the Sea, starring Angelina Jolie and Brad Pitt was partially filmed at Mġarr ix-Xini from August to November 2014.

References

Bays of Malta
Beaches of Malta
Xewkija
Għajnsielem
Sannat